Edwin Lee (born July 1879) was an English footballer. His regular position was as a forward. He was born in Altrincham, Cheshire. He played for Hurst Ramblers and Manchester United.

External links
MUFCInfo.com profile

1879 births
English footballers
Manchester United F.C. players
Year of death missing
Association football forwards